Heliorestis baculata is a rod-shaped bacterium from the genus of Heliorestis which has been isolated from shoreline soil from the Llake Ostozhe in Siberia.

References

Eubacteriales
Bacteria described in 2001